Cape Canwe is a high rock bluff  north of Vegetation Island, forming the western extremity of the Northern Foothills, Victoria Land. It was first explored and named by the Northern Party of the British Antarctic Expedition, 1910–13. The name arose from seeing this feature a long way off and wondering whether they could reach it — "can we"?

References
 

Headlands of Victoria Land
Scott Coast